= Close Mountain =

Mountain in West Virginia, United States

Coordinates: 39.1815°N 79.5822°W

Close Mountain is a summit in West Virginia, in the United States. With an elevation of 2,877 feet (877 m), Close Mountain is the 405th highest summit in the state of West Virginia.

Close Mountain derives its name from David Closs, a Scottish settler.
